The Mebane-Nuckolls House, on the Macon-Collierville Rd. near Macon, Tennessee, was built in about 1855.  It was listed on the National Register of Historic Places in 1985.  The listing included four contributing buildings and two contributing sites.

Also known as Nuckolls House, the main building is an Italianate-style building.  The other historic resources are an "original frame kitchen, a nineteenth century frame smokehouse, a nineteenth century log barn, the Mebane cemetery, and the Starkey Hare cemetery (an early settler of Fayette County and the original owner of the surrounding land.)"

References

National Register of Historic Places in Tennessee
Italianate architecture in Tennessee
Houses completed in 1855
Fayette County, Tennessee